Nopaltepec is a town in Veracruz, Mexico. It is located in the municipality of Cosamaloapan.

It is the birthplace of Fidel Herrera Beltrán, Governor of Veracruz.

Nopaltepec's major products are corn, fruit, sugar, and rice.

References

Populated places in Veracruz